Gurovka is a rural locality in Rusanovsky Selsoviet Rural Settlement, Fatezhsky District, Kursk Oblast, Russia. Population:

Geography 
The village is located on the Usozha River (a left tributary of the Svapa in the basin of the Seym), 100 km from the Russia–Ukraine border, 46 km north-west of Kursk, 2.5 km west of the district center – the town Fatezh, 1.5 km from the selsoviet center – Basovka.

 Climate
Gurovka has a warm-summer humid continental climate (Dfb in the Köppen climate classification).

Transport 
Gurovka is located on the federal route  Crimea Highway as part of the European route E105, 1 km from the road of regional importance  (Fatezh – Dmitriyev), 31 km from the nearest railway halt 29 km (railway line Arbuzovo – Luzhki-Orlovskiye).

The rural locality is situated 49 km from Kursk Vostochny Airport, 168 km from Belgorod International Airport and 237 km from Voronezh Peter the Great Airport.

References

Notes

Sources

Rural localities in Fatezhsky District